Below is a list of cities and towns in Slovakia, showing their German name. German is a minority language in Slovakia. The note Empire of Austria means that a post office - in the Kingdom of Hungary - used the German name before 1867.

Complete list

See also
German exonyms
List of cities and towns in Slovakia

References

External links
 Former names of all Slovakia´s towns and villages prior IWW (prior 1918)

Cities and towns in Slovakia
Slovakia
German
German